Miguel Ángel Almachi Cóndor (born 2 May 1985) is an Ecuadorian long-distance runner. At the 2012 Summer Olympics, he competed in the Men's marathon, finishing in 50th place.

Personal best
10000 m: 30:19.63 min A –  Lima, 20 June 2009
Half marathon: 1:06:25 –  Trujillo, 30 November 2013
Marathon: 2:15:08 –  Santiago, 1 April 2012

Achievements

References

External links

Sports reference biography
Tilastopaja biography

Ecuadorian male long-distance runners
Ecuadorian male marathon runners
1985 births
Living people
Olympic athletes of Ecuador
Athletes (track and field) at the 2012 Summer Olympics
World Athletics Championships athletes for Ecuador
21st-century Ecuadorian people